Yuta Matsumura may refer to:
 Yuta Matsumura (curler)
 Yuta Matsumura (footballer)